Fleuriel is a commune in the Allier department in central France.

Geography 
Two parts of its territory are wooded: the forest of Mosières, in the north, and the end of the forest of the Abbaye-Giverzat, in the southwest.

The town is watered by the Veauvre, a stream that flows into the Bouble.

The municipality is crossed by the provincial road 36, which provides access to Montmarault by the RD 46 northwest of the town, or to Chantelle by the RD 986 southeast.

Population

See also
Communes of the Allier department

References

External links

 Official site

Communes of Allier
Allier communes articles needing translation from French Wikipedia